This is a list of the number-one compilation albums in New Zealand for the decade of the 2010s from the Official New Zealand Music Chart, compiled by Recorded Music NZ, starting from 4 January 2010.

Number ones 

Key
 – Number-one compilation album of the year

References 

New Zealand compilation albums
2010s
2010s in New Zealand music